Tõnija is a village in Saaremaa Parish, Saare County, Estonia, on the island of Saaremaa. As of 2011 Census, the settlement's population was 43.

Tõnija village was first mentioned in 1453 as Toneyegell.

Gallery

References

Villages in Saare County